Mullina Gulabi is a 1982 Kannada-language film directed and produced by Vijay. The story was written by M. D. Sundar. The film stars Ananth Nag and Aarathi.

The film has musical score by Satyam, whilst the lyrics and dialogues were written by Chi. Udaya Shankar.

Plot
Aarathi arrives at the estate owned by two brothers played by Anant Nag and Jai Jagadish and becomes a daily-wage labourer. When younger brother Jai Jagadish falls for her and wants to marry her all hell breaks loose. It is revealed that Aarathi and Anant Nag were lovers in their college days and believing she was jilted by him, she is here to seek revenge. The song "Ee Gulabiyu Ninagagi" is very popular.

Cast 
 Anant Nag as Mohan
 Aarathi as Mala
 Roopa Devi as Radha
 Jai Jagadish as Sudhakar
 Balakrishna
 Musuri Krishnamurthy as Mandanna
 Dinesh as Sarvesha
 Y. R. Ashwath Narayan
 Tiger Prabhakar
 Rajanand
 M. S. Karanth
 Shyamala

Soundtrack 
The music was composed by Satyam, with lyrics by Chi. Udaya Shankar. The title song (both male and female versions) was a huge hit among the masses.

References

External links 
 

1982 films
1980s Kannada-language films
Indian drama films
Films scored by Satyam (composer)
Films directed by Vijay (director)